{{DISPLAYTITLE:C19H21N3O}}
The molecular formula C19H21N3O (molar mass: 307.39 g/mol, exact mass: 307.1685 u) may refer to:

 Alcaftadine
 Talastine
 Zolpidem

Molecular formulas